Imaginary Cuba is the ninth solo album by the American composer Bill Laswell, released on September 14, 1999, by Wicklow.

Critical reception
Noting the influence taken from Latin American music, AllMusic reviewer Rick Anderson wrote: "Imaginary Cuba finds [Laswell] taking an approach somewhat similar to the one he employed on his Off World One project -- building on a foundation of field recordings, he constructs complex and often dub-inflected sound collages that sound like no one but Laswell while still maintaining respect for the music's origins."

Track listing

Personnel 
Adapted from the Imaginary Cuba liner notes.

Bill Laswell – bass guitar, drum programming, musical arrangements, producer, recording
Oz Fritz – engineering
Daniel Laine – photography

Release history

References

External links 
 
 Imaginary Cuba at Bandcamp

1999 albums
Bill Laswell albums
Albums produced by Bill Laswell
Dub albums
Sound collage albums